The 2022 Henderson mayoral election was held on June 14, 2022 to elect the mayor of Henderson, Nevada. It saw the election of Michelle Romero.

Background 
Due to a court ruling regarding the elections for the city council and mayor by the Nevada Supreme Court and changes to the law regarding all elections here statewide by the Nevada Legislature and Governor Steve Sisolak, March is not eligible to run for re-election in 2022 due to term limits.

Candidates 
 Michelle Romero, Henderson City Councilwoman (2019–present)
 Frank Ficadenti, businessman and veteran
 Drew Dison

General election

Campaign 
Romero was considered the heavy favorite, due to her massive fundraising advantage, raising over $500,000 by the start of 2022, as well as several endorsements from well-known local politicians, such as incumbent mayor Debra March and County Commissioner and former mayor James B. Gibson.

Endorsements

Results

References 

Henderson
Mayoral elections in Henderson, Nevada
Henderson